Eoghan Clifford (born 26 August 1980) is an Irish Paralympic racing cyclist competing in C3 classification events. Clifford has represented Ireland at both road and track disciplines and is a multiple UCI Para-cycling World Champion, winning the C3 road race and the C3 time trial in Greenville in 2014, the scratch race at the track world championships in Apeldoorn in 2015 and the time trial event at Nottwil in 2015. He also won a bronze medal at the track world champions for the C3 pursuit in Apeldoorn in 2015 and Montichiari in 2016.

Early life
Clifford was born in 1980 in Dublin and grew up in Bruff, County Limerick. He attended both Primary and Secondary school in Bruff. He cycled back and forth to secondary school daily. He moved to Galway, where he still lives, in 1998 to study at NUI Galway. He graduated with a Bachelor of Engineering (Environmental) in 2002. While at NUI Galway he cultivated an interest in rowing, which he still enjoys.

Clifford lives with Charcot–Marie–Tooth disease, a hereditary motor and sensory neuropathy, but still races at a national level in able-bodied events.

Career
Dr Clifford has worked as a full-time lecturer at NUI Galway since 2010. He has an interest both in Transport Engineering and Water Waste Engineering.

He first entered Ireland's para cycling squad in 2014. The following year he qualified for the 2016 Summer Paralympics in Rio de Janeiro. He brought one gold and one bronze medal back with him.

Personal life
He is married to Magdalena Hajdukiewicz.

References

1980 births
Living people
Academics of the University of Galway
Alumni of the University of Galway
Cyclists at the 2016 Summer Paralympics
Irish male cyclists
Irish track cyclists
Medalists at the 2016 Summer Paralympics
Paralympic cyclists of Ireland
Paralympic medalists in cycling
Paralympic gold medalists for Ireland
Paralympic bronze medalists for Ireland
People from Galway (city)
UCI Para-cycling World Champions